Erison George Hurtault (born December 29, 1984) is an American retired sprinter who has represented Dominica in international events, including the 2008 Summer Olympics and the 2012 Summer Olympics. He specialized in the 400 metres.

He grew up in Aberdeen Township, New Jersey, where he attended Matawan Regional High School. He graduated from Columbia University. One of the most decorated athletes in recent Columbia University history, Hurtault was inducted into the Athletics Hall of Fame in 2012. He competed in the Olympic 400 metres event.

Hurtault was honored as the national flag bearer of his parents' native Dominica at the Parade of Nations at the Opening Ceremonies of the London 2012 Summer Olympics. In the Men's 400m first round event, he finished with a seasonal best time of 46.05, but did not qualify to continue competing.

Hurtault spent three seasons as a volunteer assistant track and field coach with Columbia before joining New York University Track and Field, where he spent two years as an assistant coach and several more as head coach.

After retiring from athletics, Hurtault attended New York University Stern School of Business and is now a management consultant at McKinsey & Company.

Personal bests
His personal best time is 45.40 seconds, achieved in June 2007 in Sacramento.

Outdoor
100 m: 10.85 s (wind: -2.4 m/s) –  Rieti, 6 September 2009
200 m: 20.86 s (wind: +0.8 m/s) –  New York, New York, 9 July 2011
400 m: 45.40 s –  Sacramento, California, 9 June 2007
800 m: 1:48.60 s –  Princeton, New Jersey, 22 April 2011

Indoor
400 m: 46.34 s –  New York, New York, 25 February 2007

Achievements

References

External links

Tilastopaja biography

1984 births
Living people
Dominica male sprinters
Olympic athletes of Dominica
Athletes (track and field) at the 2008 Summer Olympics
Athletes (track and field) at the 2012 Summer Olympics
Pan American Games competitors for Dominica
Athletes (track and field) at the 2011 Pan American Games
Commonwealth Games competitors for Dominica
Athletes (track and field) at the 2010 Commonwealth Games
Athletes (track and field) at the 2014 Commonwealth Games
World Athletics Championships athletes for Dominica
Columbia Lions men's track and field athletes
American people of Dominica descent
Matawan Regional High School alumni
People from Aberdeen Township, New Jersey
Sportspeople from Monmouth County, New Jersey
American male sprinters
Track and field athletes from New Jersey